The Hanmer River is a river in the Hurunui District of New Zealand.

See also
List of rivers of New Zealand

References

Land Information New Zealand - Search for Place Names

Hurunui District
Rivers of Canterbury, New Zealand
Rivers of New Zealand